R. J. Berg is a writer and executive producer of video games who has been credited on at least thirty games, including nine Star Wars games. Berg wrote and produced several titles at Electronic Arts, including American McGee's Alice. In 2001 he was named the Creative Director at LucasArts. In 2008, he worked as a consultant for Spicy Horse Software, an entertainment development studio in Shanghai. There he was the lead writer of American McGee's Grimm, and Alice: Madness Returns. He was the Chief Operations Officer at Spicy Horse until the company folded in 2016.

References

External links
 A list of games Berg has been credited on, from MobyGames

Video game producers
Video game writers
Living people
Year of birth missing (living people)